Bonaventure Cemetery is a rural cemetery located on a scenic bluff of the Wilmington River, east of Savannah, Georgia. The cemetery became famous when it was featured in the 1994 novel Midnight in the Garden of Good and Evil by John Berendt, and in the subsequent movie, directed by Clint Eastwood, based on the book.

The entrance to the cemetery is located at 330 Bonaventure Road.  Immediately inside the gates is the large and ornate tomb of William Gaston, a prominent Savannahian merchant.

History
The cemetery is located on the former site of Bonaventure Plantation, originally owned by Colonel John Mullryne. On March 10, 1846, Commodore Josiah Tattnall III sold the  plantation and its private cemetery to Peter Wiltberger. The first burials took place in 1850, and three years later, Peter Wiltberger himself was entombed in a family vault.

Major William H. Wiltberger, the son of Peter, formed the Evergreen Cemetery Company on June 12, 1868. On July 7, 1907, the City of Savannah purchased the Evergreen Cemetery Company, making the cemetery public and changing the name to Bonaventure Cemetery.

In 1867 John Muir began his Thousand Mile Walk to Florida and the Gulf. In October he sojourned for six days and nights in the Bonaventure cemetery, sleeping upon graves overnight, this being the safest and cheapest accommodation that he could find while he waited for money to be expressed from home. He found the cemetery even then breathtakingly beautiful and inspiring and wrote a lengthy chapter upon it, "Camping in the Tombs."

"Part of the grounds was cultivated and planted with live-oak (Quercus virginiana), about a hundred years ago, by a wealthy gentleman who had his country residence here But much the greater part is undisturbed. Even those spots which are disordered by art, Nature is ever at work to reclaim, and to make them look as if the foot of man had never known them. Only a small plot of ground is occupied with graves and the old mansion is in ruins.

The most conspicuous glory of Bonaventure is its noble avenue of live-oaks. They are the most magnificent planted trees I have ever seen, about fifty feet high and perhaps three or four feet in diameter, with broad spreading leafy heads. The main branches reach out horizontally until they come together over the driveway, embowering it throughout its entire length, while each branch is adorned like a garden with ferns, flowers, grasses, and dwarf palmettos.

But of all the plants of these curious tree-gardens the most striking and characteristic is the so-called Long Moss (Tillandsia usneoides). It drapes all the branches from top to bottom, hanging in long silvery-gray skeins, reaching a length of not less than eight or ten feet, and when slowly waving in the wind they produce a solemn funereal effect singularly impressive.

There are also thousands of smaller trees and clustered bushes, covered almost from sight in the glorious brightness of their own light. The place is half surrounded by the salt marshes and islands of the river, their reeds and sedges making a delightful fringe. Many bald eagles roost among the trees along the side of the marsh. Their screams are heard every morning, joined with the noise of crows and the songs of countless warblers, hidden deep in their dwellings of leafy bowers. Large flocks of butterflies, flies, all kinds of happy insects, seem to be in a perfect fever of joy and sportive gladness. The whole place seems like a center of life. The dead do not reign there alone.

Bonaventure to me is one of the most impressive assemblages of animal and plant creatures I ever met. I was fresh from the Western prairies, the garden-like openings of Wisconsin, the beech and maple and oak woods of Indiana and Kentucky, the dark mysterious Savannah cypress forests; but never since I was allowed to walk the woods have I found so impressive a company of trees as the tillandsia-draped oaks of Bonaventure.

I gazed awe-stricken as one new-arrived from another world. Bonaventure is called a graveyard, a town of the dead, but the few graves are powerless in such a depth of life. The rippling of living waters, the song of birds, the joyous confidence of flowers, the calm, undisturbable grandeur of the oaks, mark this place of graves as one of the Lord’s most favored abodes of life and light."
– "Camping in the Tombs," from A Thousand Mile Walk

Greenwich Cemetery became an addition to Bonaventure in 1933.

Operations
Citizens of Savannah and others may purchase interment rights in Bonaventure.

The cemetery is open to the public daily from 8:00 a.m. to 5:00 p.m. There is no admission fee.

Adjacent to Bonaventure Cemetery is the privately owned and newer Forest Lawn Cemetery and Columbarium.

Department of Cemeteries
The main office of the City of Savannah's Department of Cemeteries is located on the Bonaventure Cemetery grounds in the Bonaventure Administrative Building at the entrance.

Bonaventure Historical Society
The cemetery became the subject of a non-profit group, the Bonaventure Historical Society, in May 1997. The group has compiled an index of the burials at the cemetery.

Bird Girl
The cover photograph for the best-selling book Midnight in the Garden of Good and Evil, taken by Jack Leigh, featured an evocative sculpture of a young girl, the so-called Bird Girl, that had been in the cemetery, essentially unnoticed, for over 50 years. After the publication of the book, the sculpture was relocated from the cemetery in 1997 for display in Telfair Museums in Savannah. In late 2014, the statue was moved to a dedicated space in the Telfair Museums' Jepson Center for the Arts on West York Street, in Savannah.

Notable burials
 Samuel B. Adams, interim Justice of the Supreme Court of Georgia
 Conrad Aiken, novelist and poet
 Robert Houstoun Anderson (1835–1888), 2nd Lieutenant US Army, General CSA Army, Chief of Police City of Savannah
 Middleton Barnwell, bishop
 Edythe Chapman, actress
 Hugh Comer (1842–1900), president of the Georgia Central Railway
 William B. Hodgson (1801–1871), diplomat and scholar. Although he arranged with (and paid) William H. Wiltberger for burial lot 13 of section D, he was interred in lot 19 of the same section. The family of Noble Jones, including his son Noble Wimberly Jones, occupies lot 13.
 Anna Colquitt Hunter (1892–1985), co-founder of Historic Savannah Foundation
 Noble Wimberly Jones (c. 1723–1805), physician and statesman
 Jack Leigh, photographer, author
 Hugh W. Mercer, Civil War Army officer and Confederate general
 Johnny Mercer, singer/songwriter and great-grandson of Hugh W. Mercer
 James Neill, actor
 Edward Padelford (1799–1870), businessman for whom Savannah's Padelford Ward is named
 Marie Louise Scudder Myrick (1854–1934), First Female Owner, Editor, Publisher of a Southern US Newspaper (1895), The Americus Times-Recorder
 John Stoddard, president of the Georgia Historical Society and the first president of Evergreen Cemetery Company
 Josiah Tattnall Jr. (1765–1803), Senator, General, and Georgia Governor
 Josiah Tattnall III (1795–1871), Commodore USN, Captain CSA Navy
 Edward Telfair, governor
 Mary Telfair, philanthropist and art collector, daughter of Edward
 F. Bland Tucker, Episcopal minister and hymn writer
 John Walz (1844–1922), sculptor
 Gracie Watson, famous statue at her gravesite, 6 years old
 Claudius Charles Wilson (1831–1863), Civil War Confederate brigadier General
 Rosa Louise Woodberry (1869–1932), journalist, educator
 Bartholomew Zouberbuhler (1719–1766), early Presbyterian minister
 Spanish–American War veterans from Worth Bagley Camp #10 in Section K.  It is the nation's second-largest area dedicated to those killed in the Spanish–American War

Gallery

References

External links

 Bonaventure Historical Society
 Pictures from Bonaventure Cemetery
 
 

Cemeteries in Savannah, Georgia
Cemeteries on the National Register of Historic Places in Georgia (U.S. state)
Protected areas of Chatham County, Georgia
Historic districts on the National Register of Historic Places in Georgia (U.S. state)
National Register of Historic Places in Savannah, Georgia
Rural cemeteries
1846 establishments in Georgia (U.S. state)